Arthur–Leonard Historic District is a national historic district located at Liberty, Clay County, Missouri.  It encompasses 36 contributing buildings in a predominantly residential section of Liberty. The district developed between about 1868 and 1946, and includes representative examples of Greek Revival, Queen Anne, Prairie School, and Bungalow / American Craftsman style residential architecture.

It was listed on the National Register of Historic Places in 2001.

References

Historic districts on the National Register of Historic Places in Missouri
Greek Revival architecture in Missouri
Queen Anne architecture in Missouri
Prairie School architecture in Missouri
Bungalow architecture in Missouri
Buildings and structures in Clay County, Missouri
National Register of Historic Places in Clay County, Missouri
Liberty, Missouri